Margelopsidae is a family of cnidarians belonging to the order Anthoathecata.

Genera:
 Climacocodon Uchida, 1924
 Margelopsis Hartlaub, 1897
 Pelagohydra Dendy, 1902

References

Aplanulata
Cnidarian families